Mortales La Serie was a Hispanic television series that is transmitted in the Dominican Republic on Sundays at 11 pm through Telemicro channel 5, and for the rest of the world through Telemicro International on Saturday at 12 at night.  It is also available through the web.

First Season
In his first season "Mortal" I featured performances by Latino actors living abroad including Robmariel Olea, Xiomara Rodriguez, Matos Janeiro, Gus Scharr, Nicole Cucurullo, Olga Bucarreli, Mariluz Acosta,  and Laura Lebron.

History 
The first Dominican TV series directed by Kevin Martinez (2000), which is done entirely in the United Kingdom and the Dominican Republic, so that Latinos identify themselves with the stories; that develop themes inclined to cases of our people in the emblematic city, their difficulties, their fear, limitations and dreams; They are the focus of this TV project, which has brought together the most prominent Latino art professionals and the media residing in the Big Apple.

As associate producers Mr. Juan Ramon Gomez Diaz chairman of Telemicro media and Kevin Martinez, General Director of the series involved in the series.

Data Sheet
 Address \ Gral production: Kevin Martinez
 Cinematographer: Andrés Zapata
 Production: Betty Belle Batista
 Logistics: Esteffany Márquez
 Art Direction: Diana Victoria USA \ Jose Sanchez RD
 Fixed Photography: Victor Cucart

References 

 http://hoy.com.do/%C2%93mortales%C2%94-serie-de-tv-hecha-por-kevin-martinez-en-new-york/ Today
 http://www.listindiario.com/entretenimiento/2012/1/11/217779/Mortales-nueva-serie-de-TV-por-el-15 Daily
http://listindiario.com/entretenimiento/2014/8/24/334877/La-serie-Mortales-tendra-nuevo-horario-por-Telemicro Listin Diario

External links 
 Official site

Dominican Republic television series
2012 Dominican Republic television series debuts
2010s Dominican Republic television series